Aechmea setigera is a plant species in the genus Aechmea. This species is native to Bolivia, Venezuela, Colombia, Panama, Suriname, French Guiana, Ecuador, and northern Brazil.

References

setigera
Flora of Panama
Plants described in 1830
Flora of South America